The Internal Affairs Service (IAS) of the Philippine National Police (PNP) which investigates infractions allegedly committed by the members of the PNP. It was created pursuant to Republic Act (RA) 8551 otherwise known as "The PNP Reform and Reorganization Act of 1998", and is tasked to instill police discipline, enhance the delivery of police service and dispense justice.

Proposed independence 
As conceived in RA 8551, the IAS is part of the PNP - an institutional setup which has led to proposals for the IAS to be made an independent unit, since all of the unit's actions are subject to review by, and are sometimes reversed by PNP commanders. The institutional arrangement also made it difficult for the investigate any allegations which may be directed towards top PNP commanders, who are the ones who approve the investigations. As a result, in 2019, it was proposed that the agency be removed from the administration of the PNP and made an attached agency of the Philippines' Department of the Interior and Local Government.

See also 
 Security sector governance and reform in the Philippines

References

External links
 

Philippine National Police